The 2017 Hong Kong Masters was a non-ranking snooker tournament, held from 20 to 23 July 2017 at the Queen Elizabeth Stadium, Wan Chai, Hong Kong. The event is organized by the Hong Kong Billiard Sports Control Council known as HKBSCC, subvented by the Leisure and Cultural Services Department, managed by appointed event agency Yello Marketing (Yello) and sanctioned by World Snooker Limited. This tournament set the record for the largest live audience ever recorded at a snooker match with 3,000 people attending. 

Neil Robertson won the event, beating Ronnie O'Sullivan 6–3 in the final.

Prize fund
Winner: £100,000
Runner-up: £45,000
Semi-final: £35,000
Quarter-final: £22,500
Total: £315,000
Highest break: £10,000

Main draw

Final

Century breaks

Total: 9

 143, 128, 126  Ronnie O'Sullivan
 136, 100  Judd Trump
 132, 103  Marco Fu
 108, 100  Neil Robertson

References

External links 
Hong Kong Masters 2017 Official website 
Hong Kong Masters 2017 Official Facebook Page
Hong Kong Billiard Sports Control Council Co. Ltd. (HKBSCC)
Leisure and Cultural Services Department (LCSD)
Yello Sports Marketing Agency (Yello)

2017
2017 in snooker
2017 in Hong Kong sport
Snooker in Asia
July 2017 sports events in China